Tetrorchidium microphyllum is a species of plant in the family Euphorbiaceae. It is endemic to Panama. It is threatened by habitat loss.

References

Adenoclineae
Flora of Panama
Critically endangered plants
Taxonomy articles created by Polbot